Riley Austin Loos (born October 6, 2000) is an American artistic gymnast.  He was a member of the gold medal-winning team at both the 2018 and 2022 Pan American Championships.  He is a member of the United States men's national gymnastics team and currently competing in collegiate gymnastics for Stanford.

Personal life 
Loos was born in Folsom, California on October 6, 2000, to Greg and Stephanie Loos.  He has two sisters.

Gymnastics career

2018 
In January 2018 Loos competed at the RD761 International Junior Team Cup where he helped USA finish third in the team competition.  Individually he finished seventh in the all-around and won silver on floor exercise and bronze on vault.  In August Loos competed at the U.S. National Championships in the junior 17-18 division.  He placed second in the all-around behind Brandon Briones.  Loos was selected to represent the United States at the Pan American Championships alongside Cameron Bock, Spencer Goodell, Kanji Oyama, and Genki Suzuki.  Loos helped the United States win gold as a team.

2019 
Loos competed at the 2019 Winter Cup where he placed 16th in the all-around but won bronze on floor exercise behind Sam Mikulak and Jacob Moore.  In August Loos competed at the U.S. National Championships where he finished 10th in the all-around and fourth on floor exercise.

2020–21 
In early 2020 Loos competed at the Winter Cup where he finished 18th in the all-around. He also started competing for the Stanford Cardinal in collegiate gymnastics; however the NCAA season was cut short due to the ongoing COVID-19 pandemic.

Loos returned to competition at the 2021 Winter Cup where he finished second in the all-around behind Cameron Bock.  He next competed at the 2021 NCAA Championships where he helped Stanford defend their team title.  Individually he won bronze on rings.

Loos was selected to compete at the 2021 Pan American Championships; he helped the team win the silver medal behind Brazil and individually he finished fourth in the all-around.  Due to competing at the Pan American Championships, Loos was invited to compete at the upcoming Olympic Trials.

Loos finished ninth in the all-around at the Olympic Trials and was not added to the team.  In September Loos was selected to compete at the Koper Challenge Cup.  While there he finished fourth on floor exercise and rings and eighth on vault.

2022 
Loos placed eighth in the all-around at the 2022 Winter Cup.  He was selected to compete at the DTB Pokal Mixed Cup in Stuttgart alongside Colt Walker, Curran Phillips, Katelyn Jong, Karis German, and Levi Jung-Ruivivar.  He competed on floor exercise and high bar, helping the USA win.  At the NCAA Championship Loos helped Stanford defend their national title.  Additionally he placed first on rings, winning his first individual national title.

In June Loos was selected to represent the United States at the Pan American Championships alongside Brody Malone, Yul Moldauer, Colt Walker, and Shane Wiskus.  On the first day of competition Loos competed on floor exercise, rings, vault, and horizontal bar to help qualify the United States in first place to the team final.  Individually he won silver on floor exercise behind Moldauer and bronze on rings behind Brazilians Arthur Zanetti and Caio Souza.  During the team final Loos competed on floor, pommel horse, rings, vault, and horizontal bar to help the USA win gold ahead of the reigning team champion Brazil.

In late July Loos competed at the U.S. Classic where he placed seventh in the all-around but recorded the third highest vault and rings scores.

2023 
Loos competed at the 2023 Winter Cup where he placed sixth in the all-around and second on rings.  In March he competed at the Baku World Cup.

Eponymous skills

Competitive history

References

External links
 
 

2000 births
Living people
People from El Dorado Hills, California
American male artistic gymnasts
Stanford Cardinal men's gymnasts
21st-century American people